The Nonpartisan Bloc for Support of Reforms (BBWR) was an officially nonpartisan organization (but, in fact, a political party) affiliated with Lech Wałęsa. It was established in 1993 and in 1997 became part of Solidarity Electoral Action.

It was founded to continue the traditions of Józef Piłsudski's pre-war Nonpartisan Bloc for Cooperation with the Government, which likewise had been known by the same initials, BBWR.

After local electoral losses in 1994, Wałęsa issued a statement that invoked comparisons with Piłsudski, who had become dictator of Poland: "When the time comes to introduce a dictatorship, the people will force me to accept this role, and I shall not refuse."

See also
 Nonpartisan Bloc for Cooperation with the Government
 Confederation of Independent Poland

Notes

History of Poland (1989–present)
Defunct political parties in Poland
Lech Wałęsa